Philomath is an unincorporated community in Brownsville Township, Union County, in the U.S. state of Indiana.

History
A post office was established at Philomath in 1837, and remained in operation until it was discontinued in 1907.

Geography

References

Unincorporated communities in Union County, Indiana
Unincorporated communities in Indiana